In mathematics, a bilinear form is a bilinear map  on a vector space  (the elements of which are called vectors) over a field K (the elements of which are called scalars). In other words, a bilinear form is a function  that is linear in each argument separately:
   and  
   and  

The definition of a bilinear form can be extended to include modules over a ring, with linear maps replaced by module homomorphisms.

When  is the field of complex numbers , one is often more interested in sesquilinear forms, which are similar to bilinear forms but are conjugate linear in one argument.

Coordinate representation
Let  be an -dimensional vector space with basis .

If the  matrix  represents a vector  with respect to this basis, and similarly, the  matrix  represents another vector , then:

A bilinear form has different matrices on different bases. However, the matrices of a bilinear form on different bases are all congruent.

where the  form an invertible matrix .

Maps to the dual space
Define  by

This is often denoted as

where the dot ( ⋅ ) indicates the slot into which the argument for the resulting linear functional is to be placed (see Currying).

More concretely, for a finite-dimensional vector space, non-degenerate means that every non-zero element pairs non-trivially with some other element:
 for all  implies that  and
 for all  implies that .

The corresponding notion for a module over a commutative ring is that a bilinear form is  if  is an isomorphism. Given a finitely generated module over a commutative ring, the pairing may be injective (hence "nondegenerate" in the above sense) but not unimodular.

If  is finite-dimensional then one can identify  with its double dual .

In this case  is nondegenerate. By the rank–nullity theorem, this is equivalent to the condition that the left and equivalently right radicals be trivial. For finite-dimensional spaces, this is often taken as the definition of nondegeneracy:

Given any linear map  one can obtain a bilinear form B on V via

This form will be nondegenerate if and only if  is an isomorphism.

Likewise, a nondegenerate form is one for which the determinant of the associated matrix is non-zero (the matrix is non-singular). These statements are independent of the chosen basis. For a module over a commutative ring, a unimodular form is one for which the determinant of the associate matrix is a unit (for example 1), hence the term; note that a form whose matrix determinant is non-zero but not a unit will be nondegenerate but not unimodular, for example  over the integers.

Symmetric, skew-symmetric and alternating forms
We define a bilinear form to be
 Proposition Every alternating form is skew-symmetric.
 Proof This can be seen by expanding .

However, if  then a skew-symmetric form is the same as a symmetric form and there exist symmetric/skew-symmetric forms that are not alternating.

A bilinear form is symmetric (respectively skew-symmetric) if and only if its coordinate matrix (relative to any basis) is symmetric (respectively skew-symmetric). A bilinear form is alternating if and only if its coordinate matrix is skew-symmetric and the diagonal entries are all zero (which follows from skew-symmetry when ).

A bilinear form is symmetric if and only if the maps  are equal, and skew-symmetric if and only if they are negatives of one another. If  then one can decompose a bilinear form into a symmetric and a skew-symmetric part as follows

Derived quadratic form

When , the quadratic form Q is determined by the symmetric part of the bilinear form B and is independent of the antisymmetric part.  In this case there is a one-to-one correspondence between the symmetric part of the bilinear form and the quadratic form, and it makes sense to speak of the symmetric bilinear form associated with a quadratic form.

Reflexivity and orthogonality

A bilinear form  is reflexive if and only if it is either symmetric or alternating. In the absence of reflexivity we have to distinguish left and right orthogonality. In a reflexive space the left and right radicals agree and are termed the kernel or the radical of the bilinear form: the subspace of all vectors orthogonal with every other vector. A vector , with matrix representation , is in the radical of a bilinear form with matrix representation , if and only if . It is trivial if and only if the matrix  is nonsingular, and thus if and only if the bilinear form is nondegenerate.

Suppose  is a subspace.  Define the orthogonal complement

Different spaces
Much of the theory is available for a bilinear mapping from two vector spaces over the same base field to that field

It may happen that these mappings are isomorphisms; assuming finite dimensions, if one is an isomorphism, the other must be. When this occurs, B is said to be a perfect pairing.

In finite dimensions, this is equivalent to the pairing being nondegenerate (the spaces necessarily having the same dimensions). For modules (instead of vector spaces), just as how a nondegenerate form is weaker than a unimodular form, a nondegenerate pairing is a weaker notion than a perfect pairing. A pairing can be nondegenerate without being a perfect pairing, for instance  via  is nondegenerate, but induces multiplication by 2 on the map .

Terminology varies in coverage of bilinear forms. For example, F. Reese Harvey discusses "eight types of inner product". To define them he uses diagonal matrices Aij having only +1 or −1 for non-zero elements. Some of the "inner products" are symplectic forms and some are sesquilinear forms or Hermitian forms. Rather than a general field , the instances with real numbers , complex numbers , and quaternions  are spelled out. The bilinear form

is called the real symmetric case and labeled , where .  Then he articulates the connection to traditional terminology:

Relation to tensor products
If  is a bilinear form on  the corresponding linear map is given by

On normed vector spaces
Definition: A bilinear form on a normed vector space   is bounded, if there is a constant  such that for all ,

Definition: A bilinear form on a normed vector space  is elliptic, or coercive, if there is a constant  such that for all ,

Generalization to modules
Given a ring  and a right -module  and its dual module , a mapping  is called a bilinear form if

for all , all  and all .

A linear map  induces the bilinear form , and a linear map  induces the bilinear form .

See also

Citations

References
 
 
 
 
 
 
 . Also:

External links

Abstract algebra
 
Linear algebra
Multilinear algebra